Marianne Bogestedt is a Swedish ski-orienteering competitor and world champion. She won a gold medal in the classic distance at the World Ski Orienteering Championships in Velingrad in 1977, and received a silver medal with the Swedish relay team.

References

Year of birth missing (living people)
Living people
Swedish orienteers
Female orienteers
Ski-orienteers
20th-century Swedish women